Świdnica is a city in Lower Silesian Voivodeship, Poland.

Świdnica may also refer to:

Świdnica, Lubusz Voivodeship, village in Lubusz Voivodeship, Poland
Świdnica County, unit of territorial administration in Lower Silesian Voivodeship
Gmina Świdnica, Lower Silesian Voivodeship, administrative districts in Poland
Gmina Świdnica, Lubusz Voivodeship, administrative districts in Poland